List of the National Register of Historic Places listings in Dutchess County, New York

This is intended to be a complete list of the 128 properties and districts listed on the National Register of Historic Places in Dutchess County, New York outside of Poughkeepsie and Rhinebeck. The locations of National Register properties and districts (at least for all showing latitude and longitude coordinates below) may be seen in a map by clicking on "Map of all coordinates".
There are eight properties and districts which are further designated National Historic Landmarks in the county.

Locations in the city and town of Poughkeepsie are listed separately, as are the locations in the town and village of Rhinebeck.

Current listings

Poughkeepsie

Rhinebeck

Remainder of county

|}

See also

National Register of Historic Places listings in New York

References

History of Dutchess County, New York
Dutchess County